Don't Talk is a 1942 American short propaganda film, produced for Metro-Goldwyn-Mayer's Crime Does Not Pay series, about the dangers of homefront espionage in wartime. It was nominated for an Academy Award at the 15th Academy Awards for Academy Award for Best Short Subject (Two-reel).

Plot summary
German spy Beulah is posing as a cafe waitress near a depot for trucks delivering war material. She listens to the truckers' conversations and reports to her superior Otto, who is posing as Anatole, manager of a beauty salon.

Cast
 Don Douglas as FBI Agent Jack Sampson
 Gloria Holden as Beulah Anderson, spy posing as cafe waitress
 Barry Nelson as FBI Agent Freed
 Harry Worth as spy chief Otto a/k/a Anatole

See also 
 List of Allied propaganda films of World War II

References

External links 
 
 
 

1942 films
1940s spy films
1940s war films
1942 short films
American short films
American World War II propaganda shorts
American black-and-white films
Films directed by Joseph M. Newman
1940s English-language films
1940s American films